In Norse mythology, Dyggvi or Dyggve (Old Norse "Useful, Effective") was a Swedish king of the House of Ynglings. Dyggvi died and became the concubine of Hel, Loki's daughter. Dyggvi was succeeded by his son Dag the Wise. According to Snorri Sturluson, Dyggvi was the nephew of Dan, the eponymous ancestor of Denmark, through his sister Drott, and was the first to be called King by his family.

Attestations
Snorri Sturluson wrote of Dygvvi's father Domar in his Ynglinga saga (1225):

About Dyggvi's mother Snorri had more to say:

In his Ynglinga saga, Snorri Sturluson included a piece from Ynglingatal composed in the 9th century:

The Historia Norwegiæ presents a Latin summary of Ynglingatal, older than Snorri's quotation:

The even earlier source Íslendingabók also cites the line of descent in Ynglingatal and it also gives Dyggvi as the successor of Dómarr and the predecessor of Dagr: ix Dómarr. x Dyggvi. xi Dagr.

Notes

References
McKinnell, John (2005). Meeting the Other in Norse Myth and Legend. DS Brewer.

Sources
Ynglingatal
Ynglinga saga (part of the Heimskringla)
Historia Norwegiae

Mythological kings of Sweden